Night Prowler or variation, may refer to:

"Night Prowler" (song), a 1979 AC/DC song off the album Highway to Hell
"Night Prowler" (2001 song), a hip hop song by Living Legends, off their album Almost Famous (Living Legends album)
Richard Ramirez (1960-2013) a serial killer nicknamed "The Night Prowler"
The Night Prowler: The Richard Ramirez Story, a true crime book about the serial killer
Night prowler (Dungeons & Dragons), a type of monster found in Dungeons & Dragons
Nightprowler, a 1995 heroic fantasy video game designed by Croc (game designer)
Nightprowler: Second Edition, a 2006 video game published by 2 Dés Sans Faces
NightProwler SA, an airsoft gun made by Crosman
Prowlers of the Night, a 1926 U.S. silent western film

See also

 
 
 
 
 
 
 Prowler (disambiguation)
 Night (disambiguation)
 Night Stalker (disambiguation)
 The Night the Prowler (film) 1978 Australian film